Ed and Oucho's Excellent Inventions is a children's TV show, presented by Ed Petrie and his puppet cactus companion, Oucho (performed by Warrick Brownlow-Pike). Before this program Ed and Oucho were CBBC office presenters and favoured by many children.

The premise of the show was children sending in designs of inventions, with one each episode being created.

The inventions in the show were created by Artem Ltd, a company that creates props and special effects for TV and film productions.

For the second series, it aired from 2 January 2010 on BBC 2.

Episodes

Series 1 (2009)
Filming for this series began in September 2008 and ended in December 2008.

Series 2 (2010)
Filming for the second series began in August 2009.

References

Produced by Sue Morgan and Simon Parsons who also produced Whizz Whizz Bang Bang at BBC Scotland. This is a licensed television format based on the New Zealand series Let's Get Inventin'.[2][3] Presented by Greg Foot. It features a different child in each programme who has an invention idea and then the team, with the help of Ralph, tries to build it. Most attempts have been successful, although all ideas have had to be slightly changed to make them practical. Inventions have included a hover scooter, a hydraulic off-road wheel chair, basketball launcher, jet engine bed and an Air Guitar.

External links
 

BBC children's television shows
British television shows featuring puppetry
2000s British children's television series
2010s British children's television series
2009 British television series debuts
2010 British television series endings
English-language television shows